Chi Ceti  (χ Ceti), is the Bayer designation for a double star in the equatorial constellation of Cetus. They appear to be common proper motion companions, sharing a similar motion through space. The brighter component, HD 11171, is visible to the naked eye with an apparent visual magnitude of 4.66, while the fainter companion, HD 11131, is magnitude 6.75. Both lie at roughly the same distance, with the brighter component lying at an estimated distance of 75.6 light years from the Sun based upon an annual parallax shift of 43.13 mass.

The primary, component A, is an evolved K-type giant star with a stellar classification of F3 III. However, Houk and Swift (1999) listed a classification of F0 V, which would match an F-type main sequence star. It displays an infrared excess at a wavelength of 70 μm and thus is a candidate host of an orbiting debris disk.

The common proper motion companion, component B, is a G-type main sequence star with a classification of G3 V. It is a BY Draconis variable with a periodicity of 8.92 days and a variable star designation of EZ Cet.

References

External links 
 
http://www.alcyone.de/cgi-bin/search.pl?object=HR0531 
http://server3.wikisky.org/starview?object_type=1&object_id=1287

Cetus, Chi A
Cetus, Chi B
Double stars
Cetus (constellation)
Cetus, Chi
Ceti, 53
BD-11 352
008497
0531
011131 71
Ceti, EZ
BY Draconis variables
Gliese and GJ objects